Woyin Karowei Dorgu (born June 1958) is a Nigerian-born Church of England bishop and former medical doctor. He has been the Bishop of Woolwich, an area bishop in the Diocese of Southwark, since his consecration on 17 March 2017.

Early life and education
Dorgu was born in June 1958 in Burutu, Nigeria. From 1979 to 1985, he studied at the College of Medicine, University of Lagos, graduating with Bachelor of Medicine, Bachelor of Surgery (MBBS) degrees. He then worked as a general practitioner (GP).

In 1987, Dorgu moved to the United Kingdom. From 1990 to 1993, he studied theology at the London Bible College, an evangelical theological college in Northwood, Greater London. He completed a Diploma in Evangelism in 1991, a Diploma in Pastoral Studies in 1993, and graduated with a Bachelor of Arts (BA) degree in 1993. In 1993, he entered Oak Hill College, a Conservative Evangelical theological college, to train for ordained ministry. He left after two years to be ordained in the Church of England.

Ordained ministry
Dorgu was ordained in the Church of England as a deacon, by David Hope, Bishop of London, on 1 July 1995 at St Paul's Cathedral; and as a priest in 1996. From 1995 to 1998, he served his curacy at St Mark's Church, Tollington Park, Islington in the Diocese of London. He then joined St John the Evangelist Church, Upper Holloway; he served as an assistant curate/associate vicar from 1998 to 2000, team vicar from 2000 to 2012, and was the Vicar (incumbent) from 2012. On 6 March 2016, he was additionally made a prebendary of St Paul's Cathedral.

Episcopal ministry
On 20 December 2016, Dorgu was announced as the next Bishop of Woolwich, a suffragan and area bishop in the Diocese of Southwark. He was consecrated a bishop by Justin Welby, the Archbishop of Canterbury, during service at Southwark Cathedral on 17 March 2017. At the end of the service, John Sentamu, the Archbishop of York, gifted Dorgu a mitre; this mitre had been given to Sentamu by Wilfred Wood, the first black bishop in the Church of England and a former bishop of the Diocese of Southwark. As such, Dorgu became the first ever Nigerian bishop in the Church of England, and the only black bishop to be consecrated in the Church of England since Sentamu in 1996.

Views
Dorgu identifies with the evangelical tradition of the Church of England. He supports the Church's current position on human sexuality; it defines marriage as between a man and a woman, and requires gay clergy to be celibate.

In 2023, following the news that the House of Bishop's of the Church of England was to introduce proposals for blessing same-sex relationships, he signed an open letter which stated:

Personal life
Dorgu is married to Mosun; she also trained as a medical doctor in Nigeria and now works as a consultant child psychiatrist. Together they have two sons: Timi and Josh (died 2015).

References

1958 births
Living people
Nigerian Anglican priests
Bishops of Woolwich
Church of England priests
21st-century Church of England bishops
People from Delta State
University of Lagos alumni
Nigerian general practitioners
Alumni of the London School of Theology
Alumni of Oak Hill College
Evangelical Anglican bishops